The 2018–19 Melbourne Victory W-League season was the club's eleventh season in the W-League, the premier competition for women's football in Australia. The team played home games  at Epping Stadium, Lakeside Stadium and AAMI Park. The club's head coach for the season was Jeff Hopkins.

Background
The Victory entered the season having missed out on the final series in the previous three years. In 2017–18, while they had improved defensively, they only finished a point off last place. Media predictions had them finishing in the top four in 2018–19, with former player Gülcan Koca suggesting they could win the premiership/championship double.

W-League

Regular season
The Victory opened their campaign with a match against Adelaide United at AAMI Park. Despite having 60 percent of possession, they were not able to convert any of their 21 shots at goal.

Playing Newcastle Jets on 1 November at Lakeside Stadium, the Victory took an early lead with Melina Ayres scoring a long-range goal after seven minutes. Natasha Dowie made the score 2–0 in the 11th minute before Cortnee Vine pulled a goal back for the Jets a minute later.

The Victory match against Canberra United on 17 January at Seiffert Oval in Queanbeyan was abandoned after 16 minutes due to lightning. A rematch was scheduled for 5 February at McKellar Park in Canberra.

A 2–1 victory over Perth Glory at Dorrien Gardens secured the club's first W-League premiership. The Victory entered the match needing a point to win the trophy after Brisbane Roar were unexpectedly defeated.

The makeup game against Canberra United at McKellar Park on 5 January was delayed for 35 minutes due to lightning. Victory rested several first-choice players in preparation for the semi-final five days later. The match ended 0–0 and the Victory were awarded the Premier's Plate after the match.

Finals

League table

Results summary

Results by round

Players

Squad information
Updated 27 October 2018.

Transfers in

Transfers out

References

External links

Melbourne Victory FC (A-League Women) seasons